The Jijila is a right tributary of the Danube in Romania. It flows into Lake Jijila, which is connected with the Danube, near the village I. C. Brătianu.

References

Rivers of Romania
Rivers of Tulcea County